Boo Boo Runs Wild is a 1999 stand-alone animated television special, and a parody of the Hanna-Barbera cartoon series The Yogi Bear Show. It was made by The Ren & Stimpy Show creator John Kricfalusi and his company Spümcø. Boo Boo Runs Wild originally aired on Cartoon Network on September 24, 1999, along with A Day in the Life of Ranger Smith, a similar Yogi Bear-themed stand-alone special. Despite Boo Boo being the arguable star of this short, it is title carded as "A Ranger Smith Cartoon". The short is dedicated to Ed Benedict, the original character designer for The Yogi Bear Show and other Hanna-Barbera properties of the 1950s–1960s.

Since its original debut in 1999, Boo Boo Runs Wild has aired multiple times on Cartoon Network's late-night programming block, Adult Swim. Despite airing on Adult Swim, it retained its original TV-Y7 rating until 2016, when it was rerated to TV-PG. From January 2006 until April 2006, Boo Boo Runs Wild aired every Sunday on Adult Swim. Promos for these Sunday reruns would treat the program as if it was an actual series, previewing the "next episode" yet also calling it the "premiere episode" later on in the promo. On April 1, 2006, following the normal Neon Genesis Evangelion bump, Adult Swim aired Boo Boo Runs Wild as an April Fool's Day joke, despite all TV listings showing Evangelion in its normal time slot. Adult Swim re-aired Boo Boo Runs Wild on Halloween night, October 31, 2008, as part of an advertised "Halloween Stunt" night, where obscure or randomly seen shows preempted the usual programming for that Friday night. In 2011, Adult Swim re-aired Boo Boo Runs Wild every night from January 10 until January 14, as part of their "DVR Theatre". It aired again on the nights of August 12, 2016, September 5, 2017 (as a part of a "History of Adult Swim" programming event, despite not being made for the block in mind), and January 6, 2019.

Plot
Ranger Smith has gone on a rulemaking spree, posting arbitrary and nonsensical rules across all of Jellystone Park, including to the backside of a familiar-sounding moose, to his own glee. While Yogi Bear takes the new regulations with irritated annoyance, Boo Boo, usually the composed and sane one of the duo, feels increasingly repressed, and eventually, after a Ren Höek-esque rant, he loses his grip on sanity and goes feral, to Ranger Smith's dismay, as he always expected Yogi to be the one who rebelled.

Boo Boo's actions slowly escalate from feeding stolen human food to other bears to clawing the backsides off trees and then savagely devouring honey from a hive. Cindy Bear, aroused by Boo Boo's new attitude, joins him in an affair to Yogi's shock and dismay. The Chief orders Ranger Smith to put Boo Boo down over phone, which Yogi refuses to allow out of loyalty to Boo Boo. When Boo Boo witnesses the ensuing fight, he tries to intervene but is knocked out; this, along with Ranger Smith throwing water on him returns him to normal; much to everyone's delight.

Voice cast
 John Kricfalusi as Boo Boo Bear, Tree
 Stephen Worth as Yogi Bear
 Corey Burton as Ranger John Smith, Moose (cameo)
 Mary Ellen Thomas as Cindy Bear
 Michael Pataki as The Chief

See also
 A Day in the Life of Ranger Smith
 Boo-Boo Bear
 Spümcø

References

External links

1999 television specials
1990s animated television specials
American parody films
Yogi Bear television specials
Spümcø
1990s American animated films